Isaac Campbell Kidd (March 26, 1884 – December 7, 1941) was an American Rear Admiral in the United States Navy. He was the father of Admiral Isaac C. Kidd, Jr. Kidd was killed on the bridge of  during the Japanese attack on Pearl Harbor.  The highest ranking casualty at Pearl Harbor, he became the first U.S. Navy flag officer killed in action in World War II as well as the first killed in action against any foreign enemy.

He was a posthumous recipient of his nation's highest military honor—the Medal of Honor. The second ship named after him, lead ship of four s, was commissioned on March 27, 1981. An  guided missile destroyer, was the third ship named after him and was commissioned on June 9, 2007.

Early years and military service
Kidd was born in Cleveland, Ohio, in 1884.  He entered the U.S. Naval Academy in 1902, graduating with the Class of 1906 in February of that year. He was commissioned an ensign in 1908. Kidd participated in the 1907–1909 Great White Fleet cruise around the world while serving on the battleship . Following service on the battleship  and armored cruiser , Kidd became the Aide and Flag Secretary to the Commander in Chief, Pacific Fleet, the first of his many flagstaff assignments. He was an instructor at the U.S. Naval Academy in 1916–1917.

He was the executive officer of the battleship  in 1925–1926, then commanded the Navy transport  until becoming the Captain of the Port at Cristóbal, Panama Canal Zone from 1927 to 1930. Promoted to the rank of captain, he was the Chief of Staff to the Commander, Base Force, United States Fleet in 1930–1932. After three years at the Bureau of Navigation in Washington, D.C., he was the Commander of Destroyer Squadron One, Scouting Force, in 1935–1936, stationed in Long Beach, California. The Kidd family resided in a downtown Long Beach apartment building.

During the Japanese attack on Pearl Harbor on December 7, 1941, Rear Admiral Kidd was the Commander of Battleship Division One and the Chief of Staff and Aide to the Commander, Battleship Battle Force.

Kidd's body was never recovered and to this day he is considered missing in action. U.S. Navy salvage divers located his Naval Academy ring fused to a bulkhead on Arizonas bridge.  A trunk containing his personal memorabilia was found in the wreck and sent to his widow. Rediscovered in the attic by his children, both the trunk and its contents are now displayed in the museum at the USS Arizona Memorial.

Awards and decorations
Admiral Kidd posthumously received the Medal of Honor and the Purple Heart. His other awards include the Army of Cuban Pacification Medal, Mexican Service Medal, World War I Victory Medal with Atlantic Fleet Clasp, American Defense Service Medal with Fleet Clasp, Asiatic-Pacific Campaign Medal with one bronze battle star for Pearl Harbor (posthumous), and the World War II Victory Medal (posthumous).

Medal of Honor citation
For conspicuous devotion to duty, extraordinary courage, and complete disregard of his own life, during the attack on the Fleet in Pearl Harbor, Territory of Hawaii, by Japanese Forces on December 7, 1941.

Namesake and relations
Three U.S. Navy destroyers have been named in Admiral Kidd's honor. See .
Kidd's son Admiral Isaac C. Kidd, Jr., served in the US Navy from December 19, 1941 to 1978, eventually serving as Commander-in-Chief of the U.S. Atlantic Fleet.
Kidd's grandson is the Navy Captain Isaac C. Kidd III.
Camp Kidd
Admiral Kidd Park in West Long Beach, California, dedicated to Kidd by the Long Beach City Council on March 25, 1942

See also

List of Medal of Honor recipients for World War II

References

1884 births
1941 deaths
United States Navy personnel killed in World War II
Deaths by Japanese airstrikes during the attack on Pearl Harbor
United States Navy Medal of Honor recipients
Military personnel from Cleveland
United States Naval Academy alumni
United States Navy rear admirals (upper half)
United States Navy World War II admirals
Deaths by airstrike during World War II
World War II recipients of the Medal of Honor
United States Navy personnel of World War I
Missing in action of World War II
Captains who went down with the ship